Chad Soper (born 19 November 1991) is a Papua New Guinean cricketer. Born in Port Moresby to a Papua New Guinean mother and a New Zealander father, he grew up on the New South Wales Central Coast.

International career
Soper represented Papua New Guinea under-19's in the 2012 Under-19 Cricket World Cup in Australia. He took 5/32 against India to help bowl them out for 204.

He made his List A debut in the 2015–17 ICC World Cricket League Championship on 22 June 2015 against the Netherlands. He made his first-class debut in the 2015–17 ICC Intercontinental Cup on 21 November 2015 against Afghanistan. On 28 May 2016, Soper took his first five-wicket haul in a List A game in the match between Papua New Guinea and Kenya in the 2015–17 ICC World Cricket League Championship.

He made his Twenty20 International (T20) debut for Papua New Guinea against Afghanistan in the 2015 ICC World Twenty20 Qualifier tournament on 23 July 2015. He made his One Day International (ODI) debut on 4 November 2016 against Hong Kong. In the second ODI of the tour, he took his first international five wicket haul taking figures of 6/41. Soper was adjudged man of the match for his performances.

In August 2018, he was named in Papua New Guinea's squad for Group A of the 2018–19 ICC World Twenty20 East Asia-Pacific Qualifier tournament. He was the leading wicket-taker for Papua New Guinea in the tournament, with ten dismissals in six matches. In March 2019, he was named in Papua New Guinea's squad for the Regional Finals of the 2018–19 ICC World Twenty20 East Asia-Pacific Qualifier tournament. The following month, he was named in Papua New Guinea's squad for the 2019 ICC World Cricket League Division Two tournament in Namibia.

In June 2019, he was selected to represent the Papua New Guinea cricket team in the men's tournament at the 2019 Pacific Games. In September 2019, he was named in Papua New Guinea's squad for the 2019 ICC T20 World Cup Qualifier tournament in the United Arab Emirates. In August 2021, Soper was named in Papua New Guinea's squad for the 2021 ICC Men's T20 World Cup.

References

External links
 

1991 births
Living people
Papua New Guinean cricketers
Papua New Guinean sportsmen
Papua New Guinea One Day International cricketers
Papua New Guinea Twenty20 International cricketers
People from the National Capital District (Papua New Guinea)